Suruke is an administrative ward in the Kondoa district of the Dodoma Region of Tanzania. According to the 2002 census, the ward has a total population of 11,711.

References

Kondoa District
Wards of Dodoma Region